Aleksey Dovgel (born 28 July 1994) is a Belarusian former professional footballer.

References

External links
 
 

1994 births
Living people
Belarusian footballers
Association football midfielders
FC BATE Borisov players
FC Isloch Minsk Raion players
FC Torpedo Minsk players
FC Chist players